Aleksandr Svechnikov is a visually impaired Uzbekistani Paralympic athlete competing in F13-classification javelin throw events. He represented Uzbekistan at the 2016 Summer Paralympics held in Rio de Janeiro, Brazil and he won the gold medal in the men's javelin throw F13 event.

He also won the gold medal in the men's javelin throw F13 event at the 2017 World Para Athletics Championships held in London, United Kingdom with a new world record of 71.01 m.

At the 2017 Islamic Solidarity Games in Baku, Azerbaijan, he set a new world record in the men's javelin throw F13 event.

References

External links 
 

Living people
Year of birth missing (living people)
Place of birth missing (living people)
Uzbekistani male javelin throwers
Paralympic athletes with a vision impairment
Paralympic athletes of Uzbekistan
Athletes (track and field) at the 2016 Summer Paralympics
Medalists at the 2016 Summer Paralympics
Paralympic gold medalists for Uzbekistan
Paralympic medalists in athletics (track and field)
21st-century Uzbekistani people
Uzbekistani blind people